The Eswatini national rugby union team represent Eswatini in the sport of rugby union. They are ranked as a tier-three nation by the International Rugby Board (IRB). Eswatini have thus far not qualified for a Rugby World Cup, but have competed in qualifying tournaments.

History
In September 2001 then-Swaziland played in the African qualification tournaments for the 2003 Rugby World Cup in Australia. They lost their first match, in Pool B of Round 1, losing to Botswana. They lost to Madagascar in their second game.

Eswatini participated in the African qualifying tournament for the 2007 Rugby World Cup, playing in the Southern Pool of Round 1a, along with Zambia and Botswana. Swaziland won their first fixture, defeating Zambia by one point, 24 to 23. However they lost their second game 19-12 to Botswana, and finished third in the final standings on points difference.

Record

Their Test match record against all nations, updated to 18 October 2017, is as follows:

Notes

External links
 Eswatini on IRB.com
 Eswatini on rugbydata.com
 Swaziland Rugby Union
 Swaziland Rugby Union
 SKRUM

African national rugby union teams
Rugby union in Eswatini
R